William Jones (1860 – 9 May 1915) was a British Liberal Party politician.

Early history
Jones was born in Penmynydd in 1860, the son of William, a peasant farmer and Jane. His father died when he was a child, and the family subsequently moved into Llangefni. He was educated first at the British school at Llangefni, later becoming the pupil-teacher there. He continued his education at Bangor Normal College and the University College of Wales, Aberystwyth He became a country schoolmaster, before working for the London School Board, and later as a private tutor at Oxford.

Political career
Jones entered the House of Commons as Liberal MP for Arfon in the 1895 general election. He was re-elected unopposed in 1900 and in 1906. In parliament he supported the 1908 Women's Enfranchisement Bill. He was re-elected in January and December 1910. In 1911 he was appointed to the Liberal administration of H. H. Asquith as a government whip. He died in office in May 1915.

Electoral results

References

External links
 

1859 births
1915 deaths
Liberal Party (UK) MPs for Welsh constituencies
UK MPs 1895–1900
UK MPs 1900–1906
UK MPs 1906–1910
UK MPs 1910
UK MPs 1910–1918